Vitellariopsis ferruginea is a species of plant in the family Sapotaceae. It is found in Zimbabwe and possibly Mozambique.

References

ferruginea
Vulnerable plants
Taxonomy articles created by Polbot